Gerard Ah-Shung (January 15, 1947June 6, 2016) was a Seychellois public servant who served as electoral commissioner of the Electoral Commission of Seychelles from 1993 till 1999, with Hendrick Gappy succeeding him.

References

External links
Tribute on Seychelles Nation

1947 births
2016 deaths
People from Mont Fleuri